The Naval Legal Service Command (NLSC) is an Echelon 2 command of the United States Navy. The NLSC stated mission is to provide a legal service to the worldwide components of the Fleet. 

Within NLSC, Region Legal Service Offices, Defense Service Offices, and the Victims’ Legal Counsel Program deliver a range of assistance -- such as legal advice, Fleet services, and military justice support – in their respective areas of responsibility.  They also perform other functions and tasks requested or directed by a competent authority.

The command was led by the Deputy Judge Advocate General of the Navy until 2021, when the offices were separated. Rear Adm. David G. Wilson became the first-ever independent commander of NLSC; he reports to the Chief of Naval Operations.

See also
Staff Judge Advocate to the Commandant of the Marine Corps
United States Navy Judge Advocate General's Corps

References

United States Navy Judge Advocate General's Corps
Legal